Blach is a surname, from Old High German translating to the English word "black". It can also be a typo or misspelling of "black". Notable people with the name include:

 Arne Blach (1900–1977), Danish field hockey player
 Ejvind Blach (1895–1972), Danish field hockey player
 Helena Blach Lavrsen (born 1963), Danish curler and Olympic medalist
 Niels Blach (1893–1979), Danish field hockey player
 Ty Blach (born 1990), American baseball pitcher

See also
Black (disambiguation)
Blachman (disambiguation)